Best of Def Leppard (or The Best Of) is a compilation album featuring some of Def Leppard's most popular songs. The album charted at No. 6 on the UK Albums Chart.

Overview
Best of supplements 1995's Vault: Def Leppard Greatest Hits (1980–1995) as the definitive collection of Def Leppard's work. In fact, Disc one of Best of is essentially the entire Vault (UK Version) compilation album with the addition of "Long Long Way to Go" from X.
A 2-CD limited edition was released in a slipcase with more obscure fan-favourite album cuts on the second disc, including tracks from more recent albums. In the UK, a cover of The Kinks' "Waterloo Sunset" was included as a bonus. This foreshadowed the band's forthcoming '70s cover album Yeah!.

Best Of was released in a number of territories around the world, but not North America. A 2-CD best of called Rock of Ages: The Definitive Collection was issued there instead.

The single-CD edition of the album features material from 1981's High 'n' Dry through to 2002's X. Track distribution focuses largely on the band's late '80s/early '90s hits, with a single song from High 'n' Dry, two from Pyromania (1983), six from Hysteria (1987), four from Adrenalize (1992), two from Retro Active (1993), and a single song from X. "When Love & Hate Collide", the sole new song from 1995's greatest hits set Vault was also included. The 2-CD version gives a more even cross-section of the band's career, starting with two songs from On Through the Night (1980), four from High 'n' Dry, seven from Pyromania, seven from Hysteria, five from Adrenalize, two from Retro Active, "When Love & Hate Collide" the new song on Vault, two from Slang (1996), one from Euphoria (1999), two from X (2002) and one new song, the cover of "Waterloo Sunset" which was to be included in the band's forthcoming cover album Yeah! (2006).

The songs are the original album versions, with the following exceptions:
"Pour Some Sugar on Me" is the video edit version. This version actually features an extended, distorted intro, making it longer than the Hysteria version, which has the shorter "Step inside, walk this way" intro.
"Rocket" is the single edit, which runs around two and a half minutes shorter than its Hysteria album counterpart.
"Bringin' on the Heartbreak" fades out slightly earlier than the High 'n' Dry version, as the High 'n' Dry version segues into "Switch 625".

Track listing

Charts

Certifications

References

Def Leppard compilation albums
2004 greatest hits albums
Mercury Records compilation albums